IGF like family receptor 1 is a protein that in humans is encoded by the IGFLR1 gene.

References

Further reading